The Republic of Heinzenland was a short-lived and unrecognized nation in the region now known as the Austrian federal state of Burgenland, aimed at protecting the German-speaking population in Western Hungary. The state was a direct result of the disputes in Central Europe following the First World War on the future of Burgenland under either Austrian or Hungarian control. Its main leader was Social Democratic politician Hans Suchard. Due to its short life, it is known as the "Two-day Republic". The Republic was one of many unrecognized successor states in the region, including Lajtabánság and the Republic of Prekmurje.

Etymology
The name "Heinzenland" is derived from the German name for Western Hungary, Heanzenland, Hianzenland, or Hoanzenland (Heinzenland in Standard German). The name "Heanzen" or any variation of it in local dialects referred to German settlers in Western Hungary (west of Sopron), who immigrated from Bavaria and other parts of Germany to Hungary while keeping their own dialects (hence the variation between the names).

There are different theories as to why the Heinzen was used. It may have been used to mock this group of German-speakers for their deviation from the Bavarian hiaz (now), instead using hianz. It might also have been derived from the common name Heinz, or from the followers of Henry II, Duke of Bavaria, Henry I Kőszegi, or Henry IV, Holy Roman Emperor, under whose reigns the settlers came.

Background
The formation of the First Hungarian Republic and the Republic of German-Austria during the fall of Austria-Hungary had the governments of the two nations in a precarious situation. They suffered from an economic and social crisis that included heavy problems with food and coal supplies. Both Austrians and Hungarians found themselves in new countries that sprung out of the demise of Austria-Hungary - importantly, the Germans of Western Hungary. In November 1918, the Hungarian National Council set up branches in the region, but they quickly realized the problem that Burgenland was to become.

Soon after, Austrians working for the Austrian government began to distribute propaganda in the region. The first to protest against Hungarian rule were the locals of Mattersburg, who were against the teaching of Hungarian in schools. On November 17, locals from Bad Sauerbrunn and Pöttsching declared their desire for annexation by Austria. Weapons shipments started in December - On December 5, a truck carrying 300 rifles from Wiener Neustadt bound towards Burgenland was intercepted by the Hungarian police at Neufeld an der Leitha. Another shipment on the same day, also of 300 guns, successfully reached its destination of Mattersburg. Rifles were distributed among the locals, who prepared to take the town and its environs.

The Two-Day Republic
On December 5, 1918 (some sources claim the Republic was actually proclaimed on December 6), two weeks after the  demanded the self-determination of German-speaking settlements in Western Hungary, Social Democratic politician Hans Suchard, with the help of workers and local Social Democrats in Mattersburg, proclaimed the Republic of Heinzenland. This was done, apparently, without sufficient knowledge of power relations in the region. The Republic was formed with the intention of preparing the annexation of the region by Austria.

However, one day later, an armored train and a machine gun squad sent by the Hungarian military, helped by vigilantes from Sopron, put an end to the Republic, quickly occupying its territory without bloodshed. When interrogated, the rebels claimed they had been connected to the Austrian government. However, the Austrian government denied any association with the Republic - they sought to avoid any conflict with Hungary.

References

Further reading
 August Ernst: Geschichte des Burgenlandes, R. Oldenbourg Verlag München, 1991. .
 Gerald Schlag: Aus Trümmern geboren – Burgenland 1918–1921 (= Wissenschaftliche Arbeiten aus dem Burgenland. Band 106). Burgenländisches Landesmuseum, Eisenstadt 2001, Seite 136ff. (Online)

Former countries
1918 establishments in Austria-Hungary
1918 in Austria
1918 in Hungary
States and territories established in 1918
Aftermath of World War I in Austria
Aftermath of World War I in Hungary
Former countries of the interwar period
Former countries in Europe